Georges Blond (Jean-Marie Hoedick, 11 July 1906 in Marseille – 16 March 1989 in Paris), was a French writer. A prolific writer of mostly history but also other topics including fiction, Blond was also involved in far right political activity.

Early years
Blond initially came to attention as a disciple of Alexis Carrel, and when reviewing Carrel's book L'Homme, cet inconnu for the journal Le petit dauphinois commented that Carrel was one of the few writers who would genuinely alter who people thought of themselves. He became noted as a sympathiser with fascism during the mid-1930s. His works regularly appeared in L'Insurgé, a literary journal for writers on the far right edited in the late 1930s by Thierry Maulnier.

Second World War
A qualified naval engineer, Blond enlisted in the French Navy during the early stages of the Second World War but following the Battle of France was interned in the United Kingdom. Already strongly anti-British, Blond was embittered by his experiences and following repatriation he took up his pen against Britain, publishing the highly critical book L'Angleterre en guerre: Recit d'un marin francais in 1941. As a result of works like this Blond was one of only a handful of French political writers adjudged acceptable by Nazi Germany and as a result his books continued to be in print under the Vichy government.

He became a writer for the collaborationist journal Je suis partout, although Blond was associated with a "soft" tendency led by the likes of Robert Brasillach and Henri Poulain towards the end of the Second World War. In contrast to the "hard" tendency of Pierre-Antoine Cousteau and Lucien Rebatet, Blond's group wanted to de-emphasise associations with Nazism and instead concentrate on literature, sensing that Nazi defeat was imminent.

Post-war activity
His link to collaboration damaged Blond's reputation in the initial post-war period and his name appeared on a blacklist published by the Comite National d'Ecrivains in September 1945. He suffered dégradation nationale in 1949 for his involvement in collaboration. Nonetheless Blond soon became a widely read and published author again with works such as his 1981 book Histoire de la Légion étrangère, the story of the French Foreign Legion, receiving widespread attention and praise.

In 1965 Blond was one of a number of far right figures to lend his name to a petition that appeared in La Dépêche du Midi, a newspaper controlled by René Bousquet, in support of François Mitterrand at a time when the avowedly left-wing politician maintained links to the Republican Party of Liberty, a group descended from Croix-de-Feu.

Works
Georges Blond was an extremely prolific writer. This list is not exhaustive and is not classified in a chronological order of publication (release dates are tentative).

 History
 L'Épopée silencieuse
 Le Survivant du Pacifique - Histoire du Porte-avions "Enterprise"
 Convois vers l'URSS
 Le Débarquement
 L'Agonie de l'Allemagne
 Les Princes du ciel
 La Grande Aventure des Migrateurs
 La Grande Aventure des Éléphants
 L'Homme, ce Pèlerin
 J'ai vu vivre l'Amérique
 L'Amiral Togo (samouraï de la mer)
 Histoire pittoresque de notre alimentation (with Germaine Blond)
 La Légion étrangère
 La Marne
 La Grande Aventure des Baleines
 La Seconde Guerre mondiale (3 volumes)
 Histoire de la flibuste
 Rien n'a pu les abattre 
 Pétain : Biographie
 La Grande Armée du Drapeau noir 
 Verdun (L'Enfer) (Prix Richelieu)
 L'Angleterre en guerre
 Les Grandes Aventures des Océans ( 2 volumes)
 La Grande Aventure de l'Océan Indien
 Les Naufragés de Paris
 La Beauté et la Gloire : Nelson et Emma Hamilton 
 Les Enragés de Dieu
 L'Aventure du langage
 Pauline Bonaparte
 Moi Laffite, dernier roi des flibustiers
 La Grande Armée, 1804-1815
 Méditerranée (où se joue notre destin)
 Attaquez le Tirpitz
 La fin du Graf Spee
 Les Cent-Jours
 Novels
 L'amour n'est qu'un plaisir
 Journal d'un imprudent
 Le jour se lève à l'ouest
 L'île des phoques
 Novellas
 La beauté morte
 Mary Marner
 L'Ile de la déesse
 Photographic Albums
 D'Arromanches à Berlin
 La Vie surprenante des phoques
 La Vallée des Castors

References

1906 births
1989 deaths
French military personnel of World War II
French marine engineers
French collaborators with Nazi Germany
Writers from Marseille
Historians of the Napoleonic Wars
French anti-communists
20th-century French novelists
20th-century male writers
20th-century French historians